John Francis Hemenway (1856/1857 – January 1, 1926) was the founder of the Smith & Hemenway tool company.

Biography
John Francis Hemenway was born in Amber, Onondaga County, New York, the son of Lucy Francis and Seneca C. Hemenway.

He married Alice Montague on April 23, 1891.

He and Landon P. Smith organized the Smith & Hemenway Company. They bought the Maltby-Henley Company, the Bindley Automatic Wrench Company, Smith & Patterson, and the Windsor Hardware Corporation.

In 1925, ownership of the company was in dispute. He retired that year, and Landon P. Smith bought his shares in the company.

He died from a heart attack in New York on January 1, 1926.

References

1850s births
1926 deaths
20th-century American businesspeople
American manufacturing businesspeople
People from Onondaga County, New York
Red Devil, Inc.